Quartet is the thirty-fourth album by jazz pianist Herbie Hancock, featuring a quartet with trumpeter Wynton Marsalis, bassist Ron Carter and drummer Tony Williams. It was originally issued in Japan on CBS/Sony, and later given a US release by Columbia.

Overview
Without saxophonist Wayne Shorter (who was working with Weather Report and his own solo projects) or trumpeter Freddie Hubbard, Hancock, bassist Ron Carter and drummer Tony Williams reunited, and toured with a young Wynton Marsalis.  This album was recorded during the tour of Japan.

Some of the songs were from the 1965–1968 Miles Davis quintet, while one was from Hancock's own repertoire. The first two tracks on the album "Well You Needn't" and "'Round Midnight" are developed from two jazz standards by Thelonious Monk. The last track, "I Fall in Love Too Easily", develops from a 1945 Jule Styne and Sammy Cahn song.

Reception

The Penguin Guide to Jazz commented that Hancock's playing standard was not as good as earlier in his career, but concluded that, "Fortunately for the album, Marsalis is feeling his oats, dispatching his solos with testy arrogance, and of course the other two rhythm players are in superb shape." The AllMusic reviewer highlighted Marsalis's contribution, writing that "This is an extremely symbolic album, for Herbie Hancock and the V.S.O.P. rhythm section essentially pass the torch of the '80s acoustic jazz revival to the younger generation, as personified by then 19-year-old Wynton Marsalis."

Track listing
"Well You Needn't" (Thelonious Monk) - 6:29
"'Round Midnight" (Bernie Hanighen, Cootie Williams, Monk) - 6:41
"Clear Ways" (Tony Williams) - 5:00
"A Quick Sketch" (Ron Carter) - 16:27
"The Eye of the Hurricane" (Herbie Hancock) - 8:05
"Parade" (Carter) - 7:58
"The Sorcerer" (Hancock) - 7:19
"Pee Wee" (Williams) - 4:34
"I Fall In Love Too Easily" (Jule Styne, Sammy Cahn) - 5:52

Personnel
Musicians
 Herbie Hancock - piano
 Wynton Marsalis - trumpet
 Ron Carter - bass
 Tony Williams - drums

Production
 David Rubinson & Friends Inc., Herbie Hancock
 Tomoo Suzuki - Recording engineer

References

External links
 Herbie Hancock - Quartet at the Discogs website

1982 albums
Columbia Records albums
Herbie Hancock albums
Albums produced by Dave Rubinson